Aleksei Aleksandrovich Gridnev (born 28 April 1977) is a former Russian football player.

External links
 

1977 births
Living people
Russian footballers
FC Rostov players
Russian Premier League players
Russian expatriate footballers
Expatriate footballers in Moldova
Association football midfielders
FC Taganrog players